1,3,5-Trithiane is the chemical compound with the formula (CHS).  This heterocycle is the cyclic trimer of the otherwise unstable species thioformaldehyde. It consists of a six-membered ring with alternating methylene bridges and thioether groups.  It is prepared by treatment of formaldehyde with hydrogen sulfide.

Trithiane is a building block molecule in organic synthesis, being a masked source of formaldehyde.  In one application, it is deprotonated with organolithium reagents to give the lithium derivative, which can be alkylated.
(CHS)  +  RLi  →   (CHS)(CHLiS)  +  RH
(CHS)(CHLiS)  +  RBr   →  (CHS)(CHRS)  +  LiBr
(CHS)(CHRS)  +  HO   →  RCHO  +  ....
Trithiane is the dithioacetal of formaldehyde.  Other dithioacetals undergo similar reactions to the above.

It is also a precursor to other organosulfur reagents.  For example, chlorination in the presence of water affords the chloromethyl sulfonyl chloride:
(CHS)  +  9 Cl  +  6 HO   →   3 ClCHSOCl  +  12 HCl

Trithianes
Trithiane is the parent of a class of heterocycles called trithianes, that formally result from substitution of various monovalent groups for one or more of the hydrogen atoms.  The species often arise from thiation of ketones and aldehydes.  The incipient thioketones and thioaldehydes undergo trimerization. One example is 2,2,4,4,6,6-hexamethyl-1,3,5-trithiane, or trithioacetone, the trimer of thioacetone (propane-2-thione).  Alternatively 1,3,5-trithiane can be deprotonated and alkylated to afford (SCH2)n(SCHR)3-n.

The conformation of trithianes has been well investigated.

References

Sulfur heterocycles
Six-membered rings